Francis "Heno" Magee (1939 – 27 December 2016) was an Irish playwright best known for the play Hatchet. He was the recipient of the first Rooney Prize for Irish Literature, awarded in 1976. He died in Dublin on 27 December 2016 aged 77.

References

External links
 Heno Magee at The Gallery Press

1939 births
2016 deaths
Irish dramatists and playwrights
Irish male dramatists and playwrights
People from County Dublin